The USAV Worthy (T-AGOS-14) is a Missile Range Instrumentation Ship operated by the United States Army. The USAV Worthy was a Stalwart-class Modified Tactical Auxiliary General Ocean Surveillance Ship of the United States Navy.

Design
The Stalwart-class ocean surveillance ships were succeeded by the longer Victorious-class ocean surveillance ships. It was powered by a diesel-electric system of four Caterpillar D-398 diesel-powered generators and two General Electric  electric motors. This produced a total of  that drove two shafts. It had a gross register tonnage of 1,584 and a deadweight tonnage of 786.

They were built to be fitted with the Surveillance Towed Array Sensor System (SURTASS) system. The ship had an endurance of thirty days. Its complement was between thirty-two and forty-seven. Its hull design was similar to that of the s.

History

Stalwart-class ships were originally designed to collect underwater acoustical data in support of Cold War anti-submarine warfare operations in the 1980s. USNS Worthy was struck from the Navy registry in 1993 and modified to be Kwajalein Mobile Range Safety System (KMRSS) Worthy, a missile range instrumentation ship at Kwajalein Atoll's Ronald Reagan Ballistic Missile Defense Test Site, operated by the United States Army.

References

External links
 
KMRSS
NavSource

 

Stalwart-class ocean surveillance ships
Cold War auxiliary ships of the United States
Ships built in Pascagoula, Mississippi
1988 ships
Ships of the United States Army
Transport ships of the United States Army